Christie can refer to:

People:
 Christie (given name)
 Christie (surname)
 Clan Christie

Other uses:
 Christie's, the auction house
 Christie, the Canadian division of Nabisco
 Christie (TTC), subway station in Toronto, Ontario, Canada
 Christie (company), a digital projection company
 Christie (band), UK rock band
 Christie Hospital, Manchester, England, researches and treats cancer
 The Christie NHS Foundation Trust, manages the Christie Hospital
 Christie suspension, vehicle (tank) suspension system invented by U.S. engineer Walter Christie
 Christie Organ, a brand of theatre pipe organ
 Get Christie Love!, an American crime drama TV series starring Teresa Graves
  Christie (Dead or Alive), a video game character in Dead or Alive 3

See also 
 Christy (disambiguation)